Sébastien René Grosjean (born 29 May 1978) is a French former professional tennis player. Grosjean reached the semifinals at the 2001 Australian and French Opens, and at Wimbledon in 2003 and 2004. He finished eight consecutive seasons ranked in the top 30 (1999–2006), peaking at world No. 4 in October 2002. Grosjean retired from professional tennis in May 2010. In December 2018, he was named the Davis Cup captain for France.

Career

Juniors
As a junior, Grosjean posted a 90-20 singles record and a 58-12 doubles record, winning the 1996 French Open boys' doubles. He reached No. 1 in the world in both singles and doubles in December 1996.

Pro tour
Grosjean joined the professional tour in 1996. In 2003 and 2004, he reached the final of the Queen's London Tournament. In the same two years, he also reached the semifinals of Wimbledon. He finished 2001 as the No. 1 player from his country and for the first time in the top 10 becoming the first Frenchman to finish a year in the top 10 since Cédric Pioline in 1993. In 2001, Grosjean won the Davis Cup with the French team.

Grosjean is known for his extreme forehand, his best shot, he utilizes something of a western grip, which is hit at high velocities. He has appeared in four Grand Slam semifinal matches. As well as his two Wimbledon runs, he also reached the French Open semifinals in 2001. His most famous chance was at the 2001 Australian Open against Arnaud Clément. Grosjean led two sets to love and had a match point in the fourth set before Clément prevailed. This was long considered the worst 'choke' in five-set history, until the 2004 French Open final.

He won his fourth singles title at the 2007 Grand Prix de Tennis de Lyon, with a victory over countryman Marc Gicquel. He also won the doubles final with Jo-Wilfried Tsonga as a wildcard team, where they upset the first and third seeds.

Considered one of the more popular players on the circuit, he is lauded for his attractive, graceful style and classical skills. He is affectionately nicknamed 'Big John' by fans, a literal translation of his surname into English.

Personal life
Grosjean married his wife Marie-Pierre on 16 November 1998 and has a daughter named Lola (born 11 October 1998), a son named Tom (2002), and a daughter named Sam (2006). The family resides in Boca Raton, Florida (U.S.), where Grosjean trains at the Evert Tennis Academy. He is sponsored by Lacoste in apparel and Head rackets. He used the Head Radical Tour TwinTube 630 XL under various paint jobs throughout his career.

Major finals

Year-end championships finals

Singles: 1 (1 runner-up)

Masters Series finals

Singles: 2 (1 title, 1 runner-up)

ATP career finals

Singles: 13 (4 titles, 9 runner-ups)

Doubles: 7 (5 titles, 2 runner-ups)

ATP Challenger and ITF Futures finals

Singles: 5 (2–3)

Doubles: 2 (0–2)

Junior Grand Slam finals

Doubles: 1 (1 title)

Performance timelines

Singles

Doubles

Top 10 wins

References

External links
 
 
 
 Grosjean world ranking history

1978 births
Living people
French male tennis players
French Open junior champions
Olympic tennis players of France
Tennis players from Marseille
Tennis players at the 2004 Summer Olympics
Grand Slam (tennis) champions in boys' doubles